Eleanor Talbot Kinkead, also known as Mrs. Thompson Short, was a writer in the United States. Several of her works were made into films including Captain of His Soul  adapted by Lillian Ducey from her magazine story "Shackles", The Lost Sermon
based on one of her stories, and Rosemary, That's for Remembrance.

She was born in Kentucky. William B. Kinkead, a judge, was her father. Her sister was a poet. She was the great-granddaughter of Isaac Shelby, Kentucky's first and fifth governor, and his estate featured in her work.

She wrote the novel Florida Alexander, a Kentucky Girl.

Bibliography
Florida Alexander, a Kentucky Girl (1898)
The Invisible Bond (1906)
The Courage of Blackburn Blair (1907)
The Spoils of the Strong (1920)
Young Greer of Kentucky

References

19th-century American novelists
19th-century American women writers
20th-century American women writers
Kentucky women writers
American women novelists